The Third Hospital is a 2012 South Korean medical drama, starring Kim Seung-woo, Oh Ji-ho, Kim Min-jung and Choi Soo-young. It centers on the conflicts between Western and Eastern medicine and the rivalry between two brothers who espouse them. It aired on cable channel tvN from September 5 to November 8, 2012 on Wednesdays and Thursdays at 21:55 for 20 episodes.

Plot
The show is set in a hospital that houses both Western and Eastern medicine traditions. Seung-hyun and Doo-hyun are brothers and geniuses—Doo-hyun is a neurosurgeon, while Seung-hyun is the Oriental medicine specialist. The two, along with each their own friends and teams, will compete ferociously with each other because of their different views on medicine, but also come together to help save patients’ lives.

Cast
Kim Seung-woo as Kim Doo-hyun
Ahn Do-gyu as child Doo-hyun
Oh Ji-ho as Kim Seung-hyun
Kim Min-jung as Jin Hye-in
Choi Soo-young as Lee Eui-jin 
Choi Yoon-so as Jung Seung-hee
Park Geun-hyung as Kim Ha-yoon (Doo-hyun's and Seung-hyun's father)
Im Ha-ryong as Chae In-gook
Im Hyung-joon as Min Joo-ahn
 as Chief Park
Kim Jong-goo as Yang Hyan-goo
Lee Tae-kyum as Ahn Hyung-joon
Nam Moon-chul as Jo Sung-wook
Lee Jung-hun as Lee Dong-sung
Do Ye-sung as Hyun Sang-wook
Nam Ji-hyun as female singer (cameo)
Choi Soo-jin as Jeong Eui-jin (cameo)
So Hee-jung
Park Dae-kyu

Notes

References

See also
Brain
Behind the White Tower

External links
  
 
 

TVN (South Korean TV channel) television dramas
2012 South Korean television series debuts
2012 South Korean television series endings
Korean-language television shows
South Korean medical television series